Aleksandr Viktorovich Degtyaryov (born 7 September 1983) is a Russian former professional footballer. He also holds Belarusian citizenship.

Club career
He made his professional debut in the Russian Second Division in 2006 for FC Elista.

References

1983 births
People from Novoalexandrovsk
Living people
Russian footballers
Association football midfielders
FC Elista players
FC Spartak Vladikavkaz players
FC Sibir Novosibirsk players
Russian Premier League players
FC Volgar Astrakhan players
FC Sokol Saratov players
FC Mordovia Saransk players
Sportspeople from Stavropol Krai